Fiesta Noche del Rio is a seasonal outdoor performance which features the songs and dances of Mexico, Spain, Argentina, and the U.S. states of California and Texas. 

The performance is based at the Arneson River Theater in the San Antonio River Walk, and has been in operation since 1957, making it the oldest outdoor performance in the United States.

The current director and choreographer of the seven act flamenco and folklorico performance is Kathleen Rodriguez Hall.

Elizabeth Sanchez-Lopez, who was the dance coordinator for the 1993 US Olympic Festival was the director and choreographer from 1991-2018.

References

External links

Fiesta Noche del Rio season

Festivals in San Antonio